Vijayvargiya (also Vijayvargia, Vijayvergiya, Vijaywargiya, Vijayvergia, Vijay) is a merchant or (Vaishya-Baniya) community mainly from Rajasthan and Madhya Pradesh. 

According to tradition, it originated from the historical Khandela town in northern Rajasthan. Maheshwaris and Khandelwal communities also trace their origin to Khandela.

They mainly live in Rajasthan ( in Jodhpur, Tonk, Bharatpur, Jaipur, Ajmer, Bhilwara, Chittaurgarh, Udaipur, Kota and Bikaner districts) and western Madhya Pradesh ( in Rajgarh, Nimach, Mandsour, Ratlam, Indore, Guna, Bhopal and also in Gwalior districts) . They are also located at Kolkata, Mumbai, Hyderabad, Agra, Ahmedabad, Vadodara, Surat, Pune, Delhi, Faridabad, Ballabgarh, Chennai, Chandigarh, Bangalore, Nagpur, Gurgaon, Ranchi, Jhansi, America. They are mainly Vaishanava(Vaishya). The Ram Snehi sect was founded by Swami Ram Charan (1718–1798) at Shahpura, Bhilwara by establishing Ramdwara was born in this community.

Origin of Vijayvargiya
Dhanpal Vaishya was the Prime Minister of the King of Khandela Janapada (Sikar). His four offspring established four castes: Saravagi was established by Sunda, Khandelwal by Khanda, Maheshwari by Mahesha, and Vijayvargiya/Vijaywargiya by Vija. All these four castes claim their origin to be Khandela Janapada, but any other evidence does not confirm the theory of four sons. Some of the Khandela scholars accept their origin from the two brothers – Khanda and Vija. Both these castes have 72 gotras (branches) each, out of which 13 gotras of both the castes have similarity among them.

According to traditional accounts , in 363 AD, Kunwar Jayant Singh developed some differences with his father, the ruler of Khandela Janapada. Consequently, Kunwar Jayant Singh was ordered to be exiled by the ruler. Vija son of the Prime Minister of the king, along with his 72 supporters followed Kunwar Jayant Singh; they made their first halt at Jakheri. There, they made a plan and invaded the Kingdom of Ranthambhaur and succeeded in annexing the kingdom. Greatly impressed by the devotion and valor of his followers, Kunwar Jayant Singh named the entire group as Vijayvargia. These 72 men altogether, became the forerunners of the 72 clans. In the year 1906–07, Pithashah organized a huge conglomeration of the entire gotras of this caste at Pipalu village of Tonk (Rajasthan). Foundation of 16 temples was laid down consequent to this meeting. Greatly impressed by the initiative taken by Pithashah, the prominent personalities attending the conglomeration conferred the title of Chaudhary on Pithasha. Specialists called ‘Raos’ were given the responsibility of maintaining the history and record of their caste and gotras. The main gotras of Vijayvargias’ are: Jhojhota, Khunteta, Chaudhary, Patodiya, Kapadi, Parva, Nayakwal, Karodiwal, etc.

Vijayvargias’ are basically Vaishnava, but there are isolated examples of them being Shaivas also. In the field of spiritualism also Vijayvargias’ are known to have been blessed by the ‘Ramsnehi Sect’; Swami Shri Ramacharan ji Maharaj was its founder. According to a colophon of Pandva Purana of AD 1545 and a Shivpuri inscription of 1646 AD, some of them have been Jain and were regarded a branch of Saraogi Jains.

Vijayvargia community has said be cursed from Meerabai as a person from this community conspired in poisoning Meerabai, the keen devotee of Lord Krishna, . Under the patronage and motivation of Shri Ramcharan Ji Maharaj, Vijayvargias’ have played a stellar role in the building of social structure and performed various memorable deeds in the religious field as well. The famous temple of ‘Girdhar Gopal’ at Pushkar (Ajmer), which has made Meerabai an immortal, is a gift from this caste.

Gotras of Vijayvargiya

References

See also
Ram Charan Maharaj
Ramdwara
Shahpura, Bhilwara

Vaishya community
Jain communities
Indian castes
Social groups of Rajasthan
Bania communities